ARM Cuauhtémoc may refer to one of the following ships of the Mexican Navy:

 , the former American  USS Harrison (DD-573), launched in May 1942; acquired by the Mexican Navy in August 1970; taken out of service in 1982 and dismantled
 , a sail training vessel of the Mexican Navy; built in Bilbao, Spain, and launched in January 1982; in active service

Mexican Navy ship names